The 1994 Yonex All England Open was the 84th edition of the All England Open Badminton Championships. It was held from 16 to 20 March 1994, in Birmingham, for the first time since it was established, previously it had been held always in London.

It was a five-star tournament and the prize money was US$125,000.

Venue
National Indoor Arena

Final results

Men's singles

Section 1

Section 2

Women's singles

Section 1

Section 2

References

External links
 Smash: 1994 All England Open

All England Open Badminton Championships
All England Open
All England
Sports competitions in Birmingham, West Midlands
All England Open Badminton Championships